Kalija Lipscomb (born October 6, 1997) is an American football wide receiver who is a free agent. He played college football at Vanderbilt.

High school career
Lipscomb played high school football at Jesuit High School in New Orleans, Louisiana. Lipscomb was a three-star prospect coming out of high school. On February 3, 2016, Lipscomb committed to Vanderbilt, turning down offers from Louisiana Tech, Nebraska, and Northwestern.

College career
Lipscomb entered his senior season on the Biletnikoff Award watchlist. Lipscomb participated in the 2020 Senior Bowl, catchings two passes for twenty-one yards.

College career statistics

Professional career

Kansas City Chiefs
Lipscomb signed with the Kansas City Chiefs as an undrafted free agent on April 26, 2020. He was waived on September 5, 2020. He was signed to the practice squad the following day. He was released on September 29, 2020.

Green Bay Packers
On October 13, 2020, Lipscomb was signed to the Green Bay Packers practice squad. On October 20, Lipscomb was released by the Packers.

Tennessee Titans
On May 17, 2021, Lipscomb signed with the Tennessee Titans. On August 12, 2021, Lipscomb was waived by the Titans.

References

1997 births
Living people
Players of American football from New Orleans
American football wide receivers
Vanderbilt Commodores football players
Kansas City Chiefs players
Green Bay Packers players
Tennessee Titans players